Mbya Guarani is a Tupi–Guarani language spoken by approximately 6,000 Brazilians, 3,000 Argentines, and 8,000 Paraguayans. It is 75% lexically similar to Paraguayan Guarani.

Mbya Guarani is one of a number of "Guarani dialects" now generally classified as distinct languages. Mbya is closely connected to Ava Guarani, also known as Ñandeva, and intermarriage between speakers of the two languages is common. Speakers of Mbya and Ñandeva generally live in mountainous areas of the Atlantic Forest, from eastern Paraguay through Misiones Province of Argentina to the southern Brazilian states of Paraná, Santa Catarina, and Rio Grande do Sul.

Phonology

Vowels 

 Vowel sounds /ɛ, o/ can also be heard as [e, ɔ] in free variation.
 /i, u/ when preceding vowels can be heard as non-syllabic [i̯, u̯]

Consonants 

 Nasal sounds /m, n, ŋ/ can also be heard as prenasalized stops [ᵐb, ⁿd, ᵑɡ] in free variation.
 /ɲ, ŋʷ/ can be heard as [i̯~dʒ, ɡʷ] before oral vowels, and as [ɲ, ŋʷ] before nasal vowels.

References

External links 
 Mbya Guarani Collection of Robert Dooley, including interlinear texts with glosses and free translations in Portuguese and English and grammatical labels in English, from the Archive of the Indigenous Languages of Latin America. 
 A Description of the Sound System of Misiones Mbya (de Paula, 2016). 

Guarani languages
Languages of Paraguay
Languages of Argentina

Languages of Brazil